was a town located in Chiisagata District, Nagano Prefecture, Japan.

As of 2003, the town had an estimated population of 5,138 and a density of 53.44 persons per km². The total area was 96.14 km².

On October 1, 2005, Nagato, along with the village of Wada (also from Chiisagata District), was merged to create the town of Nagawa.

External links
Official website of Nagawa 

Dissolved municipalities of Nagano Prefecture
Nagawa, Nagano